MercyOne (formerly Mercy Health Network) is a system of hospitals, clinics, and health care facilities in the U.S. states of Iowa, Nebraska and surrounding communities. It is run under a joint operating agreement between Catholic Health Initiatives and Trinity Health. Bob Ritz is the current CEO, assuming the role on July 1, 2017.

In 2016, the health system announced plans for a $500 million renovation at MercyOne Des Moines Medical Center in downtown Des Moines. The project is expected to take five to eight years and include a new 11-story hospital tower as well as power plant. An Iowa Hospital Association study said that MercyOne North Iowa Medical Center, one of the system's hospitals in Mason City, accounts for 2,500 jobs and adds $226.7 million to the local economy.

Hospitals

References

External links
 

Health care companies based in Iowa
Health care companies based in Nebraska
Companies based in Des Moines, Iowa
American companies established in 1998
Hospital networks in the United States
Catholic hospital networks in the United States